The method of continued fractions is a method developed specifically for solution of integral equations of quantum scattering theory like Lippmann–Schwinger equation or Faddeev equations. It was invented by Horáček and Sasakawa  in 1983. The goal of the method is to solve the integral equation

iteratively and to construct convergent continued fraction for the T-matrix

The method has two variants. In the first one (denoted as MCFV) we construct approximations of the potential energy operator  in the form of separable function of rank 1, 2, 3 ... The second variant (MCFG method) constructs the finite rank approximations to Green's operator. The approximations are constructed within Krylov subspace constructed from vector  with action of the operator . The method can thus be understood as resummation of (in general divergent) Born series by Padé approximants. It is also closely related to Schwinger variational principle.
In general the method requires similar amount of numerical work as calculation of terms of Born series, but it provides much faster convergence of the results.

Algorithm of MCFV
The derivation of the method proceeds as follows. First we introduce rank-one (separable)
approximation to the potential

The integral equation for the rank-one part of potential is easily soluble. The full solution of the original problem can therefore be expressed as

in terms of new function . This function is solution of modified Lippmann–Schwinger equation

with 
The remainder potential term  is transparent for incoming wave

i. e. it is weaker operator than the original one.
This leads to recurrent relations

It is possible to show that the T-matrix of the original problem can be expressed in the form of chain fraction

where we defined

In practical calculation the infinite chain fraction is replaced by finite one assuming that 

This is equivalent to assuming that the remainder solution

is negligible. This is plausible assumption, since the remainder potential  has all vectors
 in its null space and it can be shown that this potential converges to zero and the chain fraction converges to the exact T-matrix.

Algorithm of MCFG
The second variant of the method construct the approximations to the Green's operator 

now with vectors

The chain fraction for T-matrix now also holds, with little bit different definition of coefficients .

Properties and relation to other methods
The expressions for the T-matrix resulting from both methods can be related to certain class of variational principles. In the case of first iteration of MCFV method we get the same result as from Schwinger variational principle with trial function . The higher iterations with N-terms in the continuous fraction reproduce exactly 2N terms (2N + 1) of Born series for the MCFV (or MCFG) method respectively. The method was tested on calculation of collisions of electrons from hydrogen atom in static-exchange approximation. In this case the method reproduces exact results for scattering cross-section on 6 significant digits in 4 iterations. It can also be shown that both methods reproduce exactly the solution of the Lippmann-Schwinger equation with the potential given by finite-rank operator. The number of iterations is then equal to the rank of the potential. The method has been successfully used for solution of problems in both nuclear and molecular physics.

References

Quantum mechanics
Scattering